Gyldendalske Boghandel, Nordisk Forlag A/S, usually referred to simply as Gyldendal is a Danish publishing house.

Founded in 1770 by Søren Gyldendal, it is the oldest and largest publishing house in Denmark, offering a wide selection of books including fiction, non-fiction  and dictionaries. Prior to 1925, it was also the leading publishing house in Norway, and it published all of Henrik Ibsen's works. In 1925, a Norwegian publishing house named Gyldendal Norsk Forlag ("Gyldendal Norwegian Publishing House") was founded, having bought rights to Norwegian authors from Gyldendal.

Gyldendal is a public company and its shares are traded on the Copenhagen Stock Exchange.

Gyldendal stopped the print version of their encyclopedia in 2006, focusing instead on selling paid subscriptions for its online encyclopedia, Den Store Danske. By 2008 it had decided that it needed another approach to support that online site. Since February 2009 Gyldendal is publishing an online, subscription-free encyclopedia.

Subsidiaries 
Subsidiaries include:
 Rosinante
 Høst & Søn
 Samlerens Forlag
 Forlaget Forum
 Forlaget Fremad
 Hans Reitzels Forlag
 Munksgaard
 Academica
 Systime
 Exlibris
 Gyldendals Bogklubber

See also
 Wivels Forlag

References

External links

Hans Reitzel Forlag 
Forlaget Munksgaard 
Gyldendals Bogklubber 

Danish companies established in 1770
Book publishing companies of Denmark
Publishing companies established in the 1770s
Mass media companies based in Copenhagen
Companies based in Copenhagen Municipality